Between Day and Night is a 1975 East German drama film directed by Horst E. Brandt. It was entered into the 9th Moscow International Film Festival.

Plot
Episodes from the life of the German poet and communist Erich Weinert (1890–1953): Life in Paris, participated in the war in Spain, the years of exile in Russia.

Cast
In alphabetical order

 Hermann Beyer as Carl
 Kurt Böwe as Erich Weinert
 Michael Christian as Fred
 Yelena Drapeko
 Wolfgang Greese as Wilhelm
 Gert Gütschow as R.
 Rolf Hoppe
 Stefan Lisewski as Hans K.
 Katja Paryla as Li Weinert
 Leonid Reutov as Wolodja
 Dietmar Richter-Reinick as Kumpel
 Gudrun Ritter as Carl's Wife
 Gisela Stoll as Elsa
 Olga Strub as Marianne
 Rudolf Ulrich as Peter
 Manfred Zetzsche as Ernst

References

External links
 

1975 films
1975 drama films
East German films
German drama films
1970s German-language films
Films set in Paris
Spanish Civil War films
Films set in the Soviet Union
1970s German films